Angus Peter McDonald (1813 – January 22, 1889) was an Ontario contractor and political figure. He represented Middlesex West in the 1st Canadian Parliament as a Conservative member.

Born in Canada, he lived in Glencoe, Ontario. McDonald was elected to represent the West riding of Middlesex in the Legislative Assembly of the Province of Canada in an 1858 by-election held following the death of John Scatcherd, serving until 1861, when he ran unsuccessfully for reelection. McDonald died in Toronto at the age of 76.

References 

1813 births
1889 deaths
Members of the Legislative Assembly of the Province of Canada from Canada West
Conservative Party of Canada (1867–1942) MPs
Members of the House of Commons of Canada from Ontario